Höljes Hydroelectric Power Station is a hydroelectric power plant on the Klarälven in Torsby Municipality, Värmland County, Sweden.

The power plant was operational in 1962. It is owned and operated by Fortum.

Dam
Höljes Dam is an embankment dam with the spillway on the right side.

Power plant 
The power plant contains 2 Francis turbine-generators. The total nameplate capacity is 127.8 MW. Its average annual generation is 533 GWh. The hydraulic head is 88 m.

See also

 List of hydroelectric power stations in Sweden

References

External links 
 

Dams in Sweden
Hydroelectric power stations in Sweden
Embankment dams
Dams completed in 1962
Energy infrastructure completed in 1962
1962 establishments in Sweden